Wright's Automatic Machinery Company, also known as Wright Machinery Company and Wright's Automatic Tobacco Packing Machine Company, is a historic machine factory located at Durham, Durham County, North Carolina.

History
It was built in 1942, and is a two-story, square Modern Movement style stuccoed brick factory building.  It features a wide ribbon of glass block underscored by a continuous concrete sill stretches across the facade at each story and recessed double-leaf entrances set into cast-concrete peaked surrounds.

Construction
The building was constructed by the Defense Plant Corporation during World War II to support the manufacturing of gunfire control equipment for the United States Navy.

Later it was used to build precision instruments here for the U. S. military and later for the National Aeronautics and Space Administration.

It was listed on the National Register of Historic Places in 2012.

References

External links
Paper Sheeter Machines

Machine manufacturers
Industrial buildings and structures on the National Register of Historic Places in North Carolina
Modern Movement architecture in the United States
Industrial buildings completed in 1942
Buildings and structures in Durham, North Carolina
National Register of Historic Places in Durham County, North Carolina
1942 establishments in North Carolina